Regional Command may refer to:

 Regional Command (British Army), a two-star command of the British Army
 Regional Military Command, Indonesian military districts
 Allgemeine-SS regional commands, Schutzstaffel (SS) commands during the Nazi era, covering Austria and Germany
 Regional Command of the Arab Socialist Ba'ath Party – Iraq Region, highest decision-making organ of the Iraqi Regional Branch of the Arab Socialist Ba'ath Party